A Home for Tanya (translit. Otchiy dom) is a 1959 Soviet drama film directed by Lev Kulidzhanov. It competed for the Palme d'Or at the 1959 Cannes Film Festival.

Cast
 Vera Kuznetsova as Natalya Avdeyevna
 Lyudmila Marchenko as Tanya
 Valentin Zubkov as Sergei Ivanovich
 Nikolai Novlyansky as Grandfather Avdey (as N. Novlyansky)
 Nonna Mordyukova as Stepanida
 Lyusyena Ovchinnikova as Nyurka
 Pyotr Kiryutkin as Mokeich
 Pyotr Alejnikov as Fyodor
 Yelena Maksimova as Markarikha
 Yuri Arkhiptsev

References

External links

1959 films
1959 drama films
1950s Russian-language films
Soviet black-and-white films
Films directed by Lev Kulidzhanov
Gorky Film Studio films
Soviet drama films